Hotwire or hot wire may refer to:

Technology
 Hot-wiring, a method of starting a car with no key
 Hot-wire foam cutter, a tool used to cut foam and polystyrene
 "Hot" wire, a wire conductor with non-zero potential in electric power distribution
 Hot-wire anemometer, an electrical device for measuring the speed of airflow

Music
 Hotwire (band)
 Hot Wire (Trapeze album), 1974
 Hot Wire (Kix album), 1991
Hot Wires, a 1987 album by Roy Buchanan

Other
 Hotwire.com, an Internet-based travel agency
 HotWired, an internet magazine
Hotwire (comics), a Radical Comics series by Warren Ellis and Steve Pugh